This is a list of the horse breeds usually considered to be of Greek origin. Some may have complex or obscure histories, so inclusion here does not necessarily imply that a breed is predominantly or exclusively from Greece.

References 

 
Horse breeds
Horse